Marino Hinestroza Angulo (born 8 July 2002) is a Colombian professional footballer who plays as a midfielder for Liga MX club Pachuca.

Career statistics

Club

Notes

Honours
Pachuca
Liga MX: Apertura 2022

References

2002 births
Living people
Colombian footballers
Colombian expatriate footballers
Colombia youth international footballers
Association football forwards
Categoría Primera B players
Orsomarso S.C. footballers
América de Cali footballers
Sociedade Esportiva Palmeiras players
Colombian expatriate sportspeople in Brazil
Expatriate footballers in Brazil
Footballers from Cali